The 1997 World Table Tennis Championships – Corbillon Cup (women's team) was the 37th edition of the women's team championship.

China won the gold medal defeating North Korea 3–0 in the final, Germany won the bronze medal.

Medalists

Final stage knockout phase

Last 16

Quarter finals

Semifinals

Third-place playoff

Final

See also
List of World Table Tennis Championships medalists

References

-
1997 in women's table tennis